La empresa perdona un momento de locura is a 1978 film directed by Mexican-Venezuelan filmmaker Mauricio Walerstein.

Plot 
The film follows Mariano Núñez, a faithful worker in a factory where he has served for the last 20 years. One day, he is victim of a nervous breakdown that unleashes an extremely violent and destructive attitude. He is sent to a psychiatrist to treat his condition so he can return to work, but when faced with reality he must choose between being in solidarity with his colleagues or adapting to the environment that surrounds him.

Release 
The film was screened for the 1979 Cannes Film Festival Directors' Fortnight (Quinzaine des Réalizateurs).

References

External links 

 La empresa perdona un momento de locura at FilmAffinity
 

1978 films
1970s Spanish-language films
Venezuelan drama films